RSAC may refer to:

 Reliance Steel & Aluminum Company, a Fortune 500 company - a commercial provider of metals and related services
 Rand Strategy Assessment Center, a branch of the Rand Corporation “think tank”
 Recreational Software Advisory Council, a non-profit organization formed to rate the content of computer games
 Remote Sensing Applications Center, a software development facility of the United States Forest Service
 Royal Scottish Automobile Club, a member of the Alliance Internationale de Tourisme
 RSA Conference, a series of computer data security conferences and the organization running them
 RsaC, a gene expression-pattern in Rsa RNA
 RSAC Software, developers of GEDitCOM genealogy software